Z-Cote is a commercial zinc oxide line manufactured and owned by BASF. Due to Z-Cote's photo-protective properties it is commonly used in personal care products and sunscreens. It is available in nano, non-nano, coated and uncoated forms. Z-Cote is a derivative of zinc oxide which is Generally Recognized As Safe and Effective (GRASE) by the FDA as a nutrient, cosmetic colour additive, skin protection active ingredient and other OTC products. Manufactured zinc oxide, such as Z-Cote, is only recognised as GRASE by the FDA when it is compliant with the Good manufacturing practice (GMP) standard. The original Sunsmart Z-Cote patent filed in 1991 for UV skin protection expired in 2015.

History 
Z-Cote was acquired from SunSmart in 1999 by BASF. It has been used in sunscreen formulations since at least 1993 in microfine form. The initial 1991 Sunsmart Z-Cote patent placed emphasis on broad-spectrum protection, especially UVA. Only in 1993 did the FDA approve an alternative petrochemical sunscreen ingredient, avobenzone, that also provided protection against UVA.

Environmental impact

Plants 
Z-Cote was studied to evaluate hypothetical agricultural impacts if it were to contaminate irrigated water. In the study it was found that Z-Cote had a negligible impact on bean (Phaseolus vulgaris) pod production and increased root length and the concentration of more nutritional elements.

Reef 
Zinc oxide is compliant with Hawaii Act 104 banning non-reef safe petrochemicals.

Zinc oxide producers 
Croda International
BASF
Umicore

References

Cosmetics
Zinc oxide
Sunscreening agents
Natural products